The 12th Parliament of Sri Lanka was a meeting of the Parliament of Sri Lanka, with the membership determined by the results of the 2001 parliamentary election held on 5 December 2001. The parliament met for the first time on 19 December 2001 and was dissolved prematurely on 7 February 2004.

Election

The 12th parliamentary election was held on 5 December 2001. The United National Front (UNF), a newly formed opposition alliance, became the largest group in Parliament by winning 109 of the 225 seats. The incumbent People's Alliance (PA) won 77 seats. The Janatha Vimukthi Peramuna (JVP) won 16 seats and the Tamil National Alliance (TNA), a new alliance of Tamil parties, won 15 seats. Smaller parties won the remaining 8 seats.

Results

The new parliament was sworn in on 19 December 2001. M. Joseph Michael Perera was elected Speaker unopposed. The post of Deputy Speaker was left vacant after the PA refused to nominate anyone. Siri Andrahennady was elected Deputy Chairman of Committees unopposed.

Government

The UNF was able to form a government with the support of the five SLMC MPs elected under their party's name (the SLMC contested under its name in three districts and with the UNF in all other districts).

On 9 December 2001, President Chandrika Kumaratunga appointed Ranil Wickremasinghe, the leader of the UNF, as the new Prime Minister. The rest of the government, comprising 24 Ministers, 28 Project Ministers and 8 Deputy Ministers, were sworn in on 12 December 2001.

The 12th parliament saw the only significant period of co-habitation in Sri Lanka since the executive presidency was introduced in 1978. There were numerous disputes between President Kumaratunga and Prime Minister Wickremasinghe, particularly over the handling of the peace process with the rebel Tamil Tigers. The political tension came to a head in early November 2003 when, as Prime Minister Wickremasinghe was out of the country, President Kumaratunga prorogued parliament, declared a state of emergency, sent troops into the streets of the capital and took control of three important ministries (defence, interior and media). On 20 January 2004 the Sri Lanka Freedom Party, President Kumaratunga's party and the main constituent of the opposition People's Alliance, and the Janatha Vimukthi Peramuna formed a new political alliance called the United People's Freedom Alliance (UPFA). A few days later on 7 February 2004 the president dissolved parliament, nearly four years ahead of schedule and despite the government having the support of the majority of parliament.

Changes in party/alliance affiliations

Deaths and resignations
The 12th parliament saw the following deaths and resignations:
5 June 2002: Murugesu Sivasithamparam (TNA-NAT) died. His replacement was Kathirgamathamby Thurairetnasingam (TNA-NAT).

Members

References
 General 
 
 
 

 Specific

Parliament of Sri Lanka
2001 Sri Lankan parliamentary election